The 1986–87 Los Angeles Kings season was the Kings' 20th season in the National Hockey League. The Kings made the playoffs, losing in the first round to the eventual Stanley Cup champion Edmonton Oilers.

Offseason

Regular season

Final standings

Schedule and results

Playoffs

Player statistics

Awards and records

Transactions
The Kings were involved in the following transactions during the 1986–87 season.

Trades

Free agent signings

Free agents lost

Waivers

Draft picks
Los Angeles's draft picks at the 1986 NHL Entry Draft held at the Montreal Forum in Montreal, Quebec. The Kings attempted to select Grant Paranica in the second round of the 1986 NHL Supplemental Draft, but the pick was ruled invalid since Paranica entered school after age 20 and therefore did not meet eligibility requirements.

Farm teams

See also
1986–87 NHL season

References

External links

Los
Los
Los Angeles Kings seasons
Los Angeles
Los Angeles